Elise Asher (1912 – 2004) was an American painter and poet. She is known for paintings on canvas and plexiglas, illustrating poems written by herself and others.

Early life 
Elise Asher was born on 15 January 1912 in Chicago. Her mother died of cancer when she was young, so she and her three siblings were primarily raised by her father. Through her father's connections as a journalist, Elise Asher met many intellectuals notable in Chicago during her childhood, including Edna St. Vincent Millay, who stayed in their home.

She attended the Art Institute of Chicago and in 1934 she graduated from Simmons School of Social Work. She moved to New York in 1947.

Career 
Her first show, a solo exhibition, was at the Tanager Gallery in New York in 1953. In the New York Herald Art Exhibition Notes announcing the show, she is described as "a self-taught painter...who writes poetry and paints in the non-objective contemporary trend." A review of her work in the Tanager Gallery stated that her work was, "Light, rather self-indulgent abstract paintings abound in nimble, frisky shapes."

She published her first poetry collection, The Meandering Absolute, in 1955. She remained active until shortly before her death in 2004. Sheep Meadow Press published a book of her art and poetry in 1994, and another collection of her poetry titled Night Train in 2000. At the time of her death, her works were included in many public collections, including those of the National Academy of Sciences and the Corcoran Gallery.

She was married to the artist Nanno de Groot, and later to the poet Stanley Kunitz, whose poetry featured in some of her works. She had one daughter, Babette.

Death
Asher died from complications from a broken hip at her Greenwich Village home on 8 March 2004, aged 92.

References

1912 births
2004 deaths
20th-century American painters
20th-century American poets
Artists from Chicago
School of the Art Institute of Chicago alumni
Simmons University alumni
American women painters